Ralph Head (August 30, 1893 – October 8, 1962) was a professional baseball pitcher who played for the 1923 Philadelphia Phillies of Major League Baseball (MLB).

Biography
Head played minor league baseball during 1913–1917 and 1919–1931; he did not play professionally in 1918 due to military service. He pitched in over 400 minor league games, with a 153–137 win–loss record for seasons with records available.

Head spent the 1923 season with the Philadelphia Phillies, his only major league season. In 35 games (13 starts) he compiled a 2–9 record with a 6.66 earned run average, while striking out 24 batters in  innings pitched. The Phillies finished last in the National League in 1923, with a 50–104 record. Two games that Head pitched in are historically notable:
 Head's start against the New York Giants on June 1, 1923, became the first game in baseball's modern era (since 1900) that a team scored in all nine innings; accomplished by the Giants, in a 22–8 victory. Head allowed six runs on six hits, facing 14 batters in  innings of work, and was the losing pitcher of the game.
 Head's final game in the major leagues, played on October 6, 1923, featured shortstop Ernie Padgett of the Boston Braves executing an unassisted triple play. The Phillies lost to the Braves, 4–1, with Head scoring the Phillies' only run.

Head was born in 1893 in Tallapoosa, Georgia. He served in the United States Army during World War I, as a private first class in Company A of the 328th Infantry Regiment; he was wounded in action in October 1918 in Sommerance, France. He died in 1962 in Muscadine, Alabama, and was interred in his hometown.

References

External links

1893 births
1962 deaths
Philadelphia Phillies players
LaGrange Terrapins players
Columbus Foxes players
Waco Navigators players
Hartford Senators players
Fort Worth Panthers players
York White Roses players
Harrisburg Senators players
Toronto Maple Leafs (International League) players
Rochester Tribe players
Waterbury Brasscos players
Pittsfield Hillies players
Binghamton Triplets players
Nashville Vols players
Norfolk Tars players
People from Tallapoosa, Georgia
Sportspeople from the Atlanta metropolitan area
Baseball players from Georgia (U.S. state)
United States Army personnel of World War I
United States Army soldiers